was the son of Shō Taikyū and last king of the First Shō Dynasty. He came to power as a young man in a kingdom whose treasury had been depleted. He engaged in efforts to conquer islands between Ryukyu and Japan and took the Mitsudomoe, the symbol of Hachiman, as his banner to emphasize his martial spirit. In 1466, he led an invasion on Kikai Island, which strained the Ryukyuan treasury with little benefit. He either died young or was possibly killed by forces within the kingdom as details are somewhat unclear. As is common for rulers who preside over the end of a dynasty, moralists portrayed him as cruel, violent, and lacking in virtue.

Family
 Father: Shō Taikyū
 Mother: Miyazato Agunshitari-agomoshirare
 Wife: daughter of Gushikawa Aji
 Concubine: daughter of Yabiku Aji
 Children:
 Shō Shashiki
 Shō Urasoe
 Shō Daiyako, descendant was Minshikameya Family
 Shō Koban

References 

Kings of Ryūkyū
First Shō dynasty
1441 births
1469 deaths
15th-century Ryukyuan monarchs